The NWA Vancouver Canadian Heavyweight Championship was the Vancouver, British Columbia version of the NWA Canadian Heavyweight title. It was the top singles title in Vancouver-based NWA All-Star Wrestling from 1982 until 1985, when the promotion withdrew from the NWA; the title was then renamed the UWA Canadian Heavyweight Championship (for its fictitious sanctioning body, the Universal Wrestling Alliance) and served as a secondary singles title until 1989.

Title history

References

Footnotes

External links
 Vance Nevada's Canadian Wrestling Results Archive
 NWA Canadian Heavyweight Title history (Vancouver) at Wrestling-Titles.com

National Wrestling Alliance championships
Heavyweight wrestling championships
Canadian professional wrestling championships
Professional wrestling in British Columbia